Murdak or Moordak may refer to:
 Moordak, Jahrom
 Murdak, Jahrom
 Murdak, Kazerun